is a platform video game published and developed by Sony Computer Entertainment for the PlayStation 2 video game console.

The game has been rated for release on PlayStation 4 but no announcement of its release has been made.

Plot

Specter, the Pipo Monkeys' leader, finds a Monkey Helmet, and hires the human scientist  to aid him in his evil plans. They establish television stations protected by the Freaky Monkey Five where they plan to broadcast TV shows worldwide. The television shows that are broadcast on every television put every human except the twins, Kei and Yumi (Satoru and Sayaka outside of North America), their aunt Aki, and Natalie (Natsumi outside of North America) into a mindless trance. When Natalie informs Kei and Yumi that Spike (Kakeru), Jimmy (Hikaru) and the Professor were all infected by the television show, Kei and Yumi go out to catch the monkeys and thwart Specter and Tomoki.

Their mission was to go to every movie set and capture all the monkeys there and destroy the satellite there. Kei and Yumi easily capture Monkey White, Monkey Blue, and Monkey Yellow. When they reach the TV Station where Monkey Pink is, Kei and Yumi's attempts to capture her fail and she escapes, although they manage to stop her Specter TV broadcast anyway. They manage to capture Monkey Red afterwards.

When they reach Tomoki City, Tomoki challenges them to a battle in his giant Tomo-King robot. Tomoki, after being defeated by Kei and Yumi, and being humiliated by Specter, lets them take his rocket to space to defeat his former partner. Once they reach Specter's outer space base of operations: Space Station SARU-3, they capture all the monkeys and deactivate the movie sets on their way to Specter. When they reach Specter, he tells them his plan about how he will use his space station to cut the earth in half and keep half of it for the monkeys (leaving the other half, originally meant for Tomoki, to the humans). Afterwards he gets in his new Gorillac Mech and tries to activate his plan. He is defeated and the two escape from the satellite, leaving Tomoki to give his life to deactivate the Twin Heavens. He survives. After Specter is defeated, Monkey Pink releases him and the rest of the Freaky Monkey Five, leaving them to be caught again in extremely similar missions. To complete the game one hundred percent, all the four hundred and forty-two monkeys have to be caught, all the time trials have to be completed with a gold time, and all the items, CDs, Video Tapes (except 28), Car Skins, Genie Dance tracks, books, etc. have to be bought. The game holds a total of four hundred and thirty-four monkeys if the secret code monkeys are not caught.

Gameplay

Playing as either Kei (Satoru) or Yumi (Sayaka), gameplay follows that of the previous games in which the player must catch several monkeys by using various gadgets controlled with right analogue stick. While there are fewer gadgets in this game than previous entries, a new feature in this game is the ability to morph into different forms through a device built by Aki. Some monkeys may also try to steal the player's Stun Club or Time Net and use it against them, and can even force them out of the level by catching them with their own net. Playing as Yumi has an additional benefit; owing to her pop idol status, certain monkeys will go star-struck upon sight of Yumi, allowing for an easy capture.

Mesal Gear Solid
In this game, players control Pipo Snake, a monkey loaded with Solid Snake's battle data, sent on a mission to rescue Snake and destroy a monkey-like Metal Gear. Gameplay is similar to Metal Gear Solid in which players have to use stealth and weapons to sneak around undetected and rescue prisoners. Players are equipped with a Banana Pistol for stunning enemies and Pineapple Grenades for breaking open flimsy walls. Similarly, the original PlayStation 2 editions of Metal Gear Solid 3: Snake Eater include a Snake vs. Monkey mode in which Snake has to capture monkeys.

Reception

Ape Escape 3 received "generally positive" reviews, according to video game review aggregator Metacritic.

References

External links

 Website (North America)

2005 video games
3D platform games
Ape Escape games
PlayStation 2 games
PlayStation 2-only games
Sony Interactive Entertainment games
Video game sequels
Video games developed in Japan
Video games set in the Arctic
Video games set in China
Video games set in Greece
Video games set in Japan
Video games set in the Middle East
Video games set in the United States
Video games featuring female protagonists
Video games scored by Masato Kouda
Single-player video games
Video games featuring protagonists of selectable gender